Ali Smith (born 13 December 1988) is a British Paralympic athlete who competes in 200 metres and 400 metres events in international level events.

Career
Smith took the silver medal in the 400m T38 event of the 2018 World Para Athletics European Championships in Berlin, Germany. She has multiple sclerosis. She won the bronze medal in the 400m T38 event of the 2021 World Para Athletics European Championships in Bydgoszcz, Poland. She came second in the 100 metres mixed class event at the 2021 British Athletics Championships. Smith was also selected to compete at the 2020 Summer Paralympics.

References

External links
 
 
 

1998 births
Living people
Sportspeople from Chester
Paralympic athletes of Great Britain
English female sprinters
Athletes (track and field) at the 2020 Summer Paralympics
Medalists at the World Para Athletics European Championships
Medalists at the 2020 Summer Paralympics